Samuel M. Lambert (10 March 1913 – 9 April 1991) was an American labor leader who served as executive secretary of the National Education Association during the administration of Richard M. Nixon. Because of the political power wielded by the group, and because of their opposition of federal funding for parochial schools, Lambert was placed on Nixon's Enemies List.

Lambert was born in Canebrake, West Virginia. He received his Bachelor's and master's degrees at West Virginia University before obtaining his doctorate at George Washington University.

Lambert died of cancer at age 78 in Washington, DC.

References 

1913 births
1991 deaths
People from McDowell County, West Virginia
George Washington University alumni
West Virginia University alumni
American trade union leaders
National Education Association people
Nixon's Enemies List